Teresa Ferster Glazier (December 7, 1907 – January 19, 2004), born Lily Teresa Ferster, was an American nonfiction writer. One of her most famous works was The Least You Should Know About English series of textbooks used by the Institute of Education Sciences.

References 

1907 births
2004 deaths
20th-century American non-fiction writers
20th-century American women writers
American textbook writers
Women textbook writers
American women non-fiction writers
21st-century American women